Lord and Peasant in Russia from the Ninth to the Nineteenth Century is a political-social-economic history of Russia written by historian Jerome Blum and published by Princeton University Press in 1961. The work covers the period from Varangian origins, to the end of serfdom in the 19th century.

Synopsis
As the title indicates, the work in centered on the evolving relationships between landowners and peasants and how that relationship impacted the political world and economic conditions inside Russia. The author explores how the growing power of towns and trade, a dispersed population, and poor transportation and communications networks influenced this fundamental social relationship underlying Russian society. In the introduction to the work, the author describes their intention to,

"trace the history of the lords and peasants, and of the relationships between them" through a period of one thousand years, "against the background of Russian political and  economic evolution, " to produce "a study in the history of human freedom" and to "contribute ultimately to an understanding of the history of  freedom in the European world"

The work begins with a brief introduction about the physical geography of Russia and the nature of serfdom. From here the author works chronologically through its period, with short sections on the Kievan and Mongol eras, followed by a longer section on the 16th and 17th centuries and the establishment of serfdom. The final 150 years of serfdom make up the longest section and almost half the book.

Academic reception
Lord and Peasant in Russia has been widely reviewed within the academic community and has become a part of the reading curriculum at several universities.

Reviews
 
 
 
 
 
 
 
 
 
 
 
 
 
 
 
 
 
 
 

Quotes
 M. S. Anderson of the London School of Economic wrote in their review, whatever faults the book may contain, "this is a solid and extremely useful piece of work. It will remain for many years a mine of information for students and an essential tool for teachers."
 Alexander Gerschenkron of Harvard University writes in the Journal of Economic History "To say it at once, Jerome Blum's new book of this title is a most impressive piece of work.' Here is the history of one thousand years of Russian agrarian relations, presented with a knowledge of the subject and a lucidity in the narration that will make this book a standard work in the field for many years to come."

About the author
Jerome Blum was an American historian and professor at Princeton University; Blum was chairman of the Department of History at Princeton from 19611967, and was named Henry Charles Lea Professor of History in 1966. Their scholarship centers on Agricultural history in central and eastern Europe. They received their Ph.D. from Johns Hopkins University in 1947. He was a member of the American Philosophical Society, which published a memorial to him in their proceedings. In addition to Lord and Peasant in Russia, Blum is the author of several books, including:
 Noble Landowners and Agriculture in Austria: 1815–1848, (1948).
 The Emergence of the European World, (1966).
 The European World since 1815: Triumph and Transition, (1970).
 The End of the Old Order in Rural Europe, (1978).
 Our Forgotten Past: Seven Centuries of Life on the Land, (1982).
 In the Beginning: The Advent of the Modern Age: Europe in the 1840s, (1994).

See also
 Serfdom in Russia
 Emancipation reform of 1861

References
Notes

Citations

External links
 Book website, Princeton University Press.

History books about Russia
History books about the Russian Empire
History books about the Grand Duchy of Moscow
History books about the Tsardom of Russia
1961 non-fiction books
English-language books
Princeton University Press books